Psychotria beddomei is a species of plant in the family Rubiaceae. It is endemic to Kerala in India.

References

beddomei
Flora of Kerala
Endangered plants
Taxonomy articles created by Polbot